"This Is How a Heart Breaks" is the second single from Matchbox Twenty frontman Rob Thomas's debut album, ...Something to Be (2005). Released in June 2005, the song was moderately successful on the charts, peaking at number 52 in the United States and number 13 in Australia. It was certified gold by the Recording Industry Association of America (RIAA) for selling over 500,000 copies, and in 2006, it was nominated for a Grammy for Best Rock Vocal Performance, Solo.

Music video
The video, directed by Pedro Romhanyi, with a cameo appearance by Chris Pratt, starts off with images of New York City then Rob Thomas singing as he walks along the street. He suddenly sees someone and runs away, chased through the New York streets by whoever he has seen. As the video progresses, Thomas escapes from the chaser and sings a few lines while walking along another part of the city. Just as he finishes the second verse, the chaser catches up to Thomas again and he runs through a bar and escapes through the bar's basement door.

Eventually, Thomas loses the chaser and goes into an elevator in another building. Once he leaves, he runs up the stairs to the fire exit and when gets to the rooftop he sings some lines then sees the chaser chasing him again. The chase continues again as Thomas tries to climb down a fire escape only to fall into a trash pile at the bottom. Thomas then runs on top of some parked cars only to run into a fence which he can't climb. Cornered, Thomas finds himself face to face with the chaser. As the video ends we get a very quick glimpse of the chaser's face who reveals himself as Rob Thomas, meaning Thomas was chasing himself for the whole video.

Track listings

US maxi-CD single
 "This Is How a Heart Breaks" (That Kid Chris club mix) – 9:47
 "This Is How a Heart Breaks" (Ford club mix) – 7:31
 "This Is How a Heart Breaks" (Pull Defibrillator mix) – 6:31
 "This Is How a Heart Breaks" (B&B club mix) – 6:22
 "This Is How a Heart Breaks" (Ford dub mix) – 7:31

UK CD single
 "This Is How a Heart Breaks"
 "Lonely No More"

UK DVD single
 "This Is How a Heart Breaks"
 "This Is How a Heart Breaks" (5.1 Surround Sound mix)
 "I Am an Illusion" (courtesy of Yahoo! Music)
 "This Is How a Heart Breaks" (video)

Australian CD single
 "This Is How a Heart Breaks"
 "Lonely No More" (courtesy of Yahoo! Music)
 "I Am an Illusion" (courtesy of Yahoo! Music)

Credits and personnel
Credits are adapted from the Australian CD single liner notes and the ...Something to Be booklet.

Studios
 Recorded at The Hit Factory (New York City), BiCoastal Music (Ossining, New York), Conway Studios, and Henson Studios (Los Angeles)
 Mixed at The Hit Factory (New York City)
 Mastered at Gateway Mastering (Portland, Maine, US)

Personnel

 Rob Thomas – writing, vocals
 Wendy Melvoin – guitar
 Jeff Trott – guitar
 Kevin Kadish – guitar
 Mike Elizondo – bass
 Matt Serletic – keys, production
 Gerald Heyward – drums
 Greater Anointing – background vocals
 Jimmy Douglass – recording, mixing
 Greg Collins – recording
 Mark Dobson – recording, digital editing
 John O'Brien – programming
 Bob Ludwig – mastering
 Ria Lewerke – art direction
 Norman Moore – art direction
 Chris Cuffaro – photography

Charts

Weekly charts

Year-end charts

Certifications

Release history

In popular culture
In 2013, Straight No Chaser covered the song with Thomas on their Under the Influence album.

References

2004 songs
2005 singles
Atlantic Records singles
Rob Thomas (musician) songs
Music videos directed by Pedro Romhanyi
Song recordings produced by Matt Serletic
Songs written by Christian Karlsson (DJ)
Songs written by Henrik Jonback
Songs written by Pontus Winnberg
Songs written by Rob Thomas (musician)